Media Source Extensions (MSE) is a W3C specification that allows JavaScript to send byte streams to media codecs within Web browsers that support HTML5 video and audio. Among other possible uses, this allows the implementation of client-side prefetching and buffering code for streaming media entirely in JavaScript. It is compatible with, but should not be confused with, the Encrypted Media Extensions (EME) specification, and neither requires the use of the other, although many EME implementations are only capable of decrypting media data provided via MSE.

Netflix announced experimental support in June 2014 for the use of MSE playback on the Safari browser on the OS X Yosemite beta release.

YouTube started using MSE with its HTML5 player in September 2013.

Browser support 
Media Source Extensions API is widely supported across all modern web browsers, with the only exception being iPhone-family devices (although it is supported on iPadOS). Firefox 37 already had a subset of MSE API available for use with only YouTube in Firefox 37 on Windows Vista or later only., while Mac OS X version had in enabled starting version 38

Minor browsers 

 Pale Moon from version 27.0, since 22 November 2016.

Players 
 NexPlayer for HTML5 MSE and EME supporting HLS and DASH
 castLabs PRESTOplay video player for HMTL5 MSE and EME supporting DASH and HLS
 Akamai Media Player as a contributor to the Dash Industry Forum and DASH.js (DASH IF reference client). AMP includes Dash.js, HLS.js and advanced QUIC protocol playback from Akamai Edge Servers
 Shaka Player, an open source javascript player library for HTML5 MSE and EME video with DASH and HLS support
 The Video Player by Comcast Technology Solutions
 THEOplayer by OpenTelly: HLS and MPEG-DASH player for cross-platform HTML5 support without the need for Flash fallback
 Viblast Player: HLS and MPEG-DASH player for HTML5 MSE and EME, with Flash fallback
 bitmovin's bitdash MPEG-DASH player for HTML5 MSE and EME, with Flash fallback
 dash-js for HTML5 MSE
 dash.js for HTML5 MSE and EME
 rx-player for HTML5 MSE and EME (Live and On Demand)
 hls.js for HTML5 MSE
 hasplayer.js for HTML5 MSE and EME, supporting DASH, Smooth Streaming and HLS
 JW Player 7 and later for MPEG-DASH using HTML5 MSE and EME
 SLDP HTML5 Player supports SLDP via MSE playback
 Azure Media Player supports MSE, EME, DASH, HLS, Flash, and Silverlight. Streaming URLs are published in an ism/manifest
 Unreal HTML5 player uses MSE for low latency (sub-second) live playback of streams sent via WebSockets by Unreal Media Server
Storm Player uses MSE as one of its delivery modes for ultra-low latency streaming via WebSockets by Storm Streaming Server

See also 
 HTML5 video
 Dynamic Adaptive Streaming over HTTP (DASH)
WebRTC

References 

HTML5
Streaming media systems
Year of introduction missing